Dechaineux can refer to:

 Emile Dechaineux a captain in the Australian Navy.
  a submarine named after him.